Isiala-Ngwa may refer to:

 One of two local government areas of Abia State, Nigeria:
 Isiala-Ngwa North
 Isiala-Ngwa South
 Diocese of Isiala-Ngwa, an Anglican diocese